Anna Straková, earlier Pichrtová (born May 19, 1973) is a Czech professional long distance runner.

Career
In 2004, Pichrtová finished 28th in the Women's marathon at the Athens Olympics, and the following year placed 27th at the World Championships in Helsinki, as well as winning the inaugural edition of the Obudu Ranch International Mountain Race in Nigeria. She has also won the Mount Washington Road Race in New Hampshire six times, the Mount Kinabalu Climbathon in Malaysia five times, and in 2006 was victorious at the European Mountain Running Championships in Malé Svatoňovice, the Grand Prix, and the Cinq 4000s at Sierre-Zinal in Switzerland (four times 2006-2009).

In 2007, Pichrtová won the 23rd World Mountain Running Trophy.
She twice won the World Long Distance Mountain Running Challenge, in 2008 (Three Peaks Race) and 2009 (Soll-Kaisermarathon).

In late 2006 Pichrtová was injured in a van accident in Nigeria while returning to the Obudu Ranch, and suffered fractures to one arm and both clavicles. After months of physiotherapy she returned to racing in June 2007.

Personal life
Pichrtová married Samuel Straka on November 11, 2010, and changed her name to Anna Straková.

Achievements

References

External links

 "Athlete Training Tip - Anna Pichrtova", Mountainrunning.com

1973 births
Living people
Sportspeople from Trenčín
Czech mountain runners
Czech female long-distance runners
Czechoslovak female long-distance runners
Czech female marathon runners
Czechoslovak female marathon runners
Olympic athletes of the Czech Republic
Athletes (track and field) at the 2004 Summer Olympics
World Athletics Championships athletes for the Czech Republic
Czech expatriates in Nigeria
World Mountain Running Championships winners
World Long Distance Mountain Running Championships winners